Penny Balfour is a film and television actress.

Selected filmography
 Flawless (1999), as Cristal
 Sidewalks of New York (2001), as Young Hooker
 Drop Back Ten (2000), as Amanda Bennett
 Ash Wednesday (2002), as Callie
 Arthur and the Invisibles (2006), Rosetta 'Rose' Suchot Montgomery
 Just Add Water (2007), as Charlene
 Arthur and the Revenge of Maltazard (2009), as Rosetta 'Rose' Suchot Montgomery
 Arthur 3: The War of the Two Worlds (2010), as Rosetta 'Rose' Suchot Montgomery

TV appearances
 Murphy Brown Season 3 / Episode 25 (1991), as Alexis Dewar
 Ed Season 1 / Episode 9 (2000), as Waitress
 Law & Order Season 9 / Episode 4 (1998), as Roni and Season 11 / Episode 9 (2001), as Carol Gibbons
 Law & Order: Criminal Intent The Good Doctor episode (2001), as Lisa Voight
 The Division Season 3 / Episode 6 (2003), as Mrs. Jenkins
 NYPD Blue Season 11 / Episode 18 (2004), as Alyssa Huber
 Malcolm in the Middle Season 5 / Episode 8 (2004), as Margie
 Blind Justice Season 1 / Episode 7 (2005), as Victoria Purdy
 24 Season 5 / Episodes 11 & 12 (2006), as Jenny McGill
 Without a Trace Season 5 / Episode 3 (2006), as Sue Young
 My Name Is Earl Season 2 / Episode 10 (2006), as Flight Attendant
 In Case of Emergency Season 1 / Episodes 7 & 8 (2007), as Moonblossom

External links
 
Penny Balfour official website

Year of birth missing (living people)
Living people
American film actresses
American television actresses
Place of birth missing (living people)
21st-century American women